Ricardo Pedro Chaves Pinto Filho (6 August 1938 – 1 April 2018) was a Roman Catholic archbishop.

Chaves Pinto Filho was born in Brazil. He was ordained to the priesthood in 1967. Chaves served as bishop of the Roman Catholic Diocese of Leopoldina, Brazil, from 1990 to 1996. He then served as archbishop of the Roman Catholic Archdiocese of Pouso Alegre, Brazil, from 1990 to 2014.

Notes

1938 births
2018 deaths
21st-century Roman Catholic archbishops in Brazil
20th-century Roman Catholic archbishops in Brazil
Roman Catholic archbishops of Pouso Alegre
Roman Catholic bishops of Leopoldina